Samuel Delmar Harrell, Jr. (born February 7, 1957) is a former American football player. He rushed for 200 yards in a game between the Houston Gamblers and the Chicago Blitz in 1984.

Rushing/Receiving
College career totals

USFL career totals

References
Houston Gamblers profile

External links
Just Sports Stats

Living people
1957 births
Players of American football from North Carolina
American football running backs
East Carolina Pirates football players
Minnesota Vikings players
Houston Gamblers players
People from Ahoskie, North Carolina
National Football League replacement players